"Don't Fall in Love" is a song by Australian pop band The Ferrets. Released in June 1977 as the lead single from their debut studio album Dreams of a Love, the song peaked a number 2 on the Australian Kent Music Report.

The song was recorded in three to eight hours with the intention of being the B-side for "Lies" but producer Ian Molly Meldrum (under the pseudo Willie Everfinish) realised "it was too good to be B-side".

Track listing
 Australian 7-inch (K-6825)
 "Don't Fall in Love"
 Lies"

Charts

Weekly charts

Year-end charts

References

1977 singles
1977 songs
Mushroom Records singles